Hydrovatus obtusus, is a species of predaceous diving beetle found in Sri Lanka, Indonesia, Laos, Malaysia, Thailand, Vietnam and possibly in India, Myanmar and China.

The 4th to 6th antennal segments are enlarged. In male, stridulatory files consist of many minute discernable ridges. Male has antenna with unequally broad 4 to 11 segments.

References 

Dytiscidae
Insects of Sri Lanka
Insects described in 1855